is a Japanese-born American electronic engineer and inventor specializing in the field of semiconductor technology, professor at the Materials Department of the College of Engineering, University of California, Santa Barbara (UCSB), and is regarded as the inventor of the blue LED, a major breakthrough in lighting technology. 

Together with Isamu Akasaki and Hiroshi Amano, he is one of the three recipients of the 2014 Nobel Prize for Physics "for the invention of efficient blue light-emitting diodes, which has enabled bright and energy-saving white light sources". In 2015, his input into commercialization and development of energy-efficient white LED lighting technology was recognized by the Global Energy Prize. In 2021, Nakamura, along with Akasaki, Nick Holonyak, M. George Craford and Russell D. Dupuis were awarded the Queen Elizabeth Prize for Engineering "for the creation and development of LED lighting, which forms the basis of all solid state lighting technology".

Careers 
Nakamura graduated from the University of Tokushima in 1977 with a B.Eng. degree in electronic engineering, and obtained an M.Eng. degree in the same subject two years later, after which he joined the Nichia Corporation, also based in Tokushima. It was while working for Nichia that Nakamura invented the method for producing the first commercial high brightness gallium nitride (GaN) LED whose brilliant blue light, when partially converted to yellow by a phosphor coating, is the key to white LED lighting, which went into production in 1993.

Previously, J. I. Pankove and co-workers at RCA put in considerable effort, but did not manage to make a marketable GaN LED in the 1960s. The principal problem was the difficulty of making strongly p-type GaN. Nakamura drew on the work of another Japanese group led by Professor Isamu Akasaki, who published their method to make strongly p-type GaN by electron-beam irradiation of magnesium-doped GaN; however, this method was not suitable for mass production. Nakamura managed to develop a thermal annealing method which was much more suitable for mass production. In addition, he and his co-workers worked out the physics and pointed out the culprit was hydrogen, which passivated acceptors in GaN.

At the time, many considered creating a GaN LED too difficult to produce; therefore Nakamura was fortunate that the founder of Nichia, (1912–2002), was willing to support and fund his GaN project. However, the senior Ogawa ceded the presidency to his son-in-law Eiji Ogawa (in 1989), and the company under Eiji's direction ordered him to suspend work on GaN, claiming it was consuming too much time and money. Nakamura continued to develop the blue LED on his own and in 1993 succeeded in making the device.

Despite these circumstances, once Nakamura succeeded in creating a commercially viable prototype, 3 orders of magnitude (1000 times) brighter than previously successful blue LEDs, Nichia pursued developing the marketable product. The company's gross receipt surged from just over ¥20 billion yen(≈US$200 million) in 1993 to ¥80 billion(≈US$800 million) by 2001, 60 percent of which was accounted for by sales of blue LED products. The company's workforce doubled between 1994 and 1999 from 640 to 1300 employees.

Nakamura was awarded a D.Eng. degree from the University of Tokushima in 1994.  He left Nichia Corporation in 1999 and took a position as a professor of engineering at the University of California, Santa Barbara.

In 2001, Nakamura sued his former employer Nichia over his bonus for the discovery as a part of a series of lawsuits between Nichia and Nakamura with Nichia's US competitor Cree Inc.; they agreed in 2000 to jointly sue Nichia at the expense of Cree and Nakamura received stock options from Cree. Nakamura claimed that he received only  (≈) for his discovery of "404 patent," though Nichia's president Eiji Ogawa's side of the story was that he was shocked beyond belief that the court would award Nakamura ¥20 billion, and downplaying the significance of the "404 patent," opined that the company had adequately compensated him for the innovation through promotions and bonuses amounting to ¥62 million over 11 years and annual salary which was raised to ¥20 million by the time Nakamura quit Nichia.

Nakamura sued for ¥2 billion (<US$20 million) as his fair share for the invention, and the district court awarded him ten times the amount, ¥20 billion (<US$200 million). However, Nichia appealed the award and the parties settled in 2005 for ¥840 million (≈US$8.1 million, less than 5% of the award amount), which was still the largest payment ever paid by a Japanese company to an employee for an invention; an amount only enough to cover legal expenses incurred by Nakamura.

Nakamura has also worked on green LEDs, and is responsible for creating the white LED and blue laser diodes used in Blu-ray Discs and HD DVDs.

Nakamura is a professor of Materials at the University of California, Santa Barbara. In 2008, Nakamura, along with fellow UCSB professors Dr. Steven DenBaars and Dr. James Speck, founded Soraa, a developer of solid-state lighting technology built on pure gallium nitride substrates. Nakamura holds 208 US utility patents as of May 5, 2020.

Recognition
2001 – Asahi Prize from the Japanese Newspaper, Asahi Shimbun
2002 – Benjamin Franklin Medal in Physics from the Franklin Institute.
2006 – Finland's Millennium Technology Prize for his continuing efforts to make cheaper and more efficient light sources.
2007 – nominee for the European Inventor Award awarded by the European Patent Office
2008 – Prince of Asturias Award for Technical and Scientific Research. 
2008 – Honorary degree of Doctor of Engineering from Hong Kong University of Science and Technology.
2008 – Holst Memorial Lecture Award [Eindhoven University of Technology and Royal Philips Research, the Netherlands].
2009 – Harvey Prize from the Technion in Israel.
2012 – Silicon Valley Intellectual Property Law Association (SVIPLA) Inventor of the Year.
2014 – Nobel Prize in Physics together with Prof. Isamu Akasaki and Prof. Hiroshi Amano for inventing blue light-emitting diodes.
2015 – Global Energy Prize for the invention, commercialization and development of energy-efficient white LED lighting technology 
2015 – Asia Game Changer Award
2017 – Mountbatten Medal
2018 – Zayed Future Energy Prize
2021 – Queen Elizabeth Prize for Engineering
2022 – Golden Plate Award of the American Academy of Achievement

See also
 List of Japanese Nobel laureates

References
Citations

Bibliography

Further reading
Shuji Nakamura, Gerhard Fasol, Stephen J. Pearton, The Blue Laser Diode : The Complete Story, Springer; 2nd edition, October 2, 2000,

External links
Professor Nakamura's home page at UCSB
The Solid State Lighting and Energy Center at UCSB
Shuji Nakamura Wins $188.7 Million Settlement from Former Employer Nichia for Blue Spectrum Breakthrough Technology
New York Times article on Nakamura's settlement with Nichia
 — Nitride semiconductor light-emitting device
Shuji Nakamura wins the 2006 Millennium Technology Prize
Nichia's Shuji Nakamura: Dream of the Blue Laser Diode
2008 Prince of Asturias Award For Technical and Scientific Research 
Harvey Prize
Shuji Nakamura SPIE Photonics West plenary presentation: Future and present technologies of solid state lighting

1954 births
Living people
20th-century American engineers
20th-century American inventors
21st-century American engineers
21st-century American inventors
American electronics engineers
American Nobel laureates
Asia Game Changer Award winners
Draper Prize winners
Japanese academics
Japanese electronics engineers
Japanese emigrants to the United States
Japanese inventors
Japanese Nobel laureates
Light-emitting diode pioneers
Members of the United States National Academy of Engineering
People from Ehime Prefecture
Tokushima University alumni
University of California, Santa Barbara faculty